The qualifier Mongol tribes was established as an umbrella term in the early 13th century, when Temüjin (later Genghis Khan) united the different tribes under his control and established the Mongol Empire. There were 19 Nirun tribes (marked (N) in the list) that descended from Bodonchar and 18 Darligin tribes (marked (D) in the list), which were also core Mongolic tribes but not descending from Bodonchar. The unification created a new common ethnic identity as Mongols. Descendants of those clans form the Mongolian nation and other Inner Asian people
.

Almost all of tribes and clans mentioned in the Secret History of the Mongols  and some tribes mentioned in the Tarikh-i-Rashidi, there are total 33 Mongol tribes.

Khamag Mongol confederation included Genghis Khan's ethnicity of Mongol.

Khori Tümed
Khorilar 
Dorben (N)
Uriankhat
Ma'alikh baya'ut (D)
Jarchi'ut Adangkhan (D)
Belgunot
Bugunot
Khatagin (N)
Eljigin
Salji'ut
Jadaran (N)
Baarin (N)
Manan Ba'arin
Jaruud
Noyakin (N)
Barlas (N)
Buda'at (N) 
Adargin/Adarkin (N)
Chonos (N)
Telenggut
Uru'ut (N)
Manghut (N)
Taichi'ut (N)
Süldüsün (D)
'Naked' Ba'arin
Besut (N)
Oronar
Khongkhotan 
Arulad
Sunud 
Khabturkhas
Gheniges
Yürki
Kiyat
Jurkin
Khadagin
Mangkhol

Keraites

 A Turco-Mongol Christian (Nestorian) nation. Prominent Christian figures were Tooril and Sorghaghtani Beki.

Tumen Tubegun; Mongolian: Tümen Tübegün
Dungkhait; Mongolian:Dongoid
Ubchikh
Jirgin
Ongchijid

Tatar confederation

Airi'ut, mentioned in connection with Ambakhai's death
Buiri'ut, mentioned in connection with Ambakhai's death
Juyin other Tatars, or maybe a military organization, mentioned in connection with Ambakhai's death
Chakhan Tatar, mentioned in connection with the final destruction of the Tatar; Mongolian: Tsagaan Tatar
Alchi Tatar, mentioned in connection with the final destruction of the Tatar
Duta'ut Tatar, mentioned in connection with the final destruction of the Tatar
Alukhai Tatar, mentioned in connection with the final destruction of the Tatar
Tariat Tatar

Merkit confederation
The Merkits were a Mongol tribe or potentially a Mongolised Turkic people who opposed the rise of Temüjin, and kidnapped his new wife Börte. They were defeated and absorbed into the Mongol nation early in the 13th century.

Uduyid; Mongolian:Uduid Mergid
Uvas, Uvas Mergid
Khaad, Khaad Mergid

Naimans

In The Secret History of the Mongols, the Naiman subtribe the "Güchügüd" are mentioned. According to Russian Turkologist Nikolai Aristov's view, the Naiman Khanate's western border reached the Irtysh River and its eastern border reached the Mongolian Tamir River. The Altai Mountains and southern Altai Republic were part of the Naiman Khanate. They had diplomatic relations with the Kara-Khitans, and were subservient to them until 1175. In the Russian and Soviet historiography of Central Asia they were traditionally ranked among the Mongol-speaking tribes. For instance, such Russian orientalists as Vasily Bartold, Grigory Potanin, Boris Vladimirtsov, Ilya Petrushevsky, Nicholas Poppe, Lev Gumilyov, Vadim Trepavlov classified them as one of Mongol, Other scholars classified them as a Turkic people from Sekiz Oghuz (means "Eight Oghuz" in Turkic). However, the term "Naiman" has Mongolian origin meaning "eight", but their titles are Turkic, and they are thought by some to be possibly Mongolized Turks. They have been described as Turkic-speaking, as well as Mongolian-speaking. Like the Khitans and the Uyghurs, many of them were Nestorian Christians or Buddhists.

Ongud
The Ongud (also spelled Ongut or Öngüt; Mongolian: Онгуд, Онход; Chinese: 汪古, Wanggu; from Old Turkic öng "desolate, uninhabited; desert" plus güt "class marker") were a Turkic tribe that later became Mongolized active in what is now Inner Mongolia in northern China around the time of Genghis Khan (1162–1227).

Many Ongud were members of the Church of the East, They lived in an area lining the Great Wall in the northern part of the Ordos Plateau and territories to the northeast of it.

Dughlat
Mentioned in the Jami' al-tawarikh.

Other groups mentioned in Secret History of the Mongols

Groups whose affiliation is not really made clear: these groups may or may not be related to any of the tribes and clans mentioned above:

Olkhonud, the clan of Temüjin's mother (D); Mongolian: Olkhunuud
Khongirad, the tribe Börte, Temüjin's first wife, descends from (D)
some clans whose members join Temüjin after the first victory over the Merkit and the separation from Jamukha:
Jalair'
Tarkhut
Bishi'ut; Mongolian: Bishiüd
Bayads
Khinggiadai (D), Khinggit, subclan of Olhunoud; Mongolian: Khingid
Gorlos (D), subclan of Olhunoud
Ikires; Mongolian: Ikhires
Sakhait
Arulat (Mongolian:Arulad)(D)
Oronar
some clans that take part in Sangums conspiracy:
Khardakit
Ebugedjin; Mongolian: Övögjin
Kharta'at (N?)
Khorulas, clan that joins Chinggis at the Baljun lake
Tokhura'ut
Negus or Chonos tribe, clan whose chief is killed together with the 70 Chinos princes

See also
 List of Mongol states
List of modern Mongol clans
 Proto-Mongols
 Zubu
 Shiwei

References

Mongolian tribes and clans
Tribes and clans, medieval
 
 
History of Inner Mongolia
History of the Mongol Empire
Mongol